Tennessee Reef is a coral reef located within the Florida Keys National Marine Sanctuary. It lies to the southeast of Long Key.  It consists of drowned (deep) spur-and-groove reef.  Much of the reef is within a designated "Research Only" zone.

An unmanned reef light is located near the reef.

External links
 Benthic Habitat Map

References
 NOAA National Marine Sanctuary Maps, Florida Keys East
 NOAA Website on Tennessee Reef
 NOAA Navigational Chart 11449

Coral reefs of the Florida Keys